Pavel Adrian Dulcea (born 25 November 1978) is a Romanian former striker. Currently he is a manager.

Club career 
He started his career in his home town, in the 1995/96 season, at FC Râmnicu Vâlcea in Romanian Second League. The oldest know this team by the name Chimia Râmnicu Vâlcea. When he was a youth, after an international tournament played in Naples by his team, he was offered by Salernitana, but his family declined the offer.

After leaving Râmnicu Vâlcea, in 1998, followed a period of almost 10 years spent only with teams from Ardeal. With one exception, the 2001/02 season, where he spent time with the Hungarian teams Györi and Siófok. This being his only experiences outside of Romanian football. During this entire period of 10 years, he played for teams such as Gloria Bistrița, Unirea Dej, Olimpia Satu Mare, CFR Cluj, Gaz Metan Mediaș and Jiul Petroșani.

His debut in the Romanian First League was in the 1998/99 season, when he played for Gloria Bistrița. He only played 6 games that season, failing to score a goal. Also in Bistrița, but in his second period at Gloria, he made his debut in the Europe. In the 2000/01 season he played in the UEFA Intertoto Cup against FC Jazz Pori from Finland.

He came to FC Argeș in the 2007. Argeș had been relegated to Liga II and were aiming for promotion. He had a good season, managing to score 14 goals in 22 matches. Thanks to his goals, he was nicknamed "Dulcea Boom Boom" by Arges fans. He played with FC Argeș in Liga I in the following season. He scored 7 times in 31 games, 2 of the goals being scored in the last leg, in Argeș's spectacular 5-2 victory over Dinamo. He stayed with the team even in difficult moments. At the end of the 2008/09 season, Argeș was relegated due to the corruption scandal. Cornel Penescu, the owner of the club at that time, had been involved. Adrian remained with the team in the next season, in Liga II, where he played 23 matches and scored 7 goals.

After that, in 2010 he moved to CS Mioveni, where he stayed one season. Then he moved to ALRO Slatina for a season and returned to FC Argeș where he stayed until the club was disaffiliated and went extinct. 

Adrian remained in Pitesti, choosing to be involved in the revival of FC Argeș. He signed with SCM Pitesti and played there two seasons, in Liga III. In 2015 he ended his career as a footballer.

Personal life 
He is an AC Milan fan, because of the legendary team managed by Arrigo Sachi, with Gullit, Rijkaard and Van Basten. Marco van Basten was his role model as a footballer. As a coach, he has Bobby Robson as his model who impressed him with his modesty. 

He has a son, Patrick Dulcea, who is also a footballer. He plays at the academy of Farul Constanta, being one of the best players of his age.

External links
http://www.romaniansoccer.ro/players/d/dulcea_adrian.shtml
http://www.nela.hu//nch_pid.php?id=2067
https://arges-sport.ro/adrian-dulcea-a-fost-numit-antrenor-secund-al-nationalei-u20-a-romaniei/
https://fcolimpia.ro/interviu-adrian-dulcea/
https://www.gsp.ro/fotbal/liga-1/adrian-dulcea-interviu-dupa-ce-a-preluat-o-pe-fc-arges-trebuie-sa-tinem-cu-dintii-de-liga-1-617351.html

1978 births
Living people
Romanian footballers
FC Unirea Dej players
FC Olimpia Satu Mare players
Győri ETO FC players
CFR Cluj players
ACF Gloria Bistrița players
CSM Jiul Petroșani players
FC Argeș Pitești players
Liga I players
Liga II players
Nemzeti Bajnokság I players
Romanian football managers
FC Argeș Pitești managers
Romanian expatriate footballers
Expatriate footballers in Hungary
Romanian expatriate sportspeople in Hungary
Association football forwards
Sportspeople from Râmnicu Vâlcea